The 2017–18 Old Dominion Monarchs women’s basketball team will represent Old Dominion University during the 2017–18 NCAA Division I women's basketball season. The Monarchs, led by first-year head coach Nikki McCray-Penson, play their home games at Ted Constant Convocation Center and were members of Conference USA. They finished the season 8–23, 6–10 in C-USA play to finish in a 3-way tie for tenth place. They lost in the first round of the C-USA women's tournament to Rice.

Previous season 
The Monarchs finished the 2016–17 season 17-14, 11–7 in C-USA play to finish in sixth place. They defeated UTEP in the first round of the C-USA tournament before losing to Southern Miss in the quarterfinals. The Lady Monarchs did not participate in the postseason.

Preseason 
Head coach Karen Barefoot resigned on May 3 to take the same position at UNC Wilmington. On May 24, Old Dominion announced the hiring of McCray-Penson, then a South Carolina assistant coach.

Roster

Schedule 

|-
!colspan=12 style=|Exhibition

|-
!colspan=12 style=|Non-conference regular season

|-
!colspan=12 style=|C-USA regular season

|-
!colspan=12 style=| C-USA Tournament

See also
2017–18 Old Dominion Monarchs men's basketball team

References 

Old Dominion Monarchs women's basketball seasons
Old Dominion